Lune is a river in Lower Saxony, Germany.

The Lune is a small lowland river, which is joined initially by the Volkmarster Lune on the boundary between the borough of Bremervörde and the district of Cuxhaven.
Until the beginning of the 17th century the river was a major transport artery and navigable until Deelbrügge (nowadays a district of Beverstedt). It was named after the explorer Gerhard von Lune who lived between 1602 and 1666[2]

See also
List of rivers of Bremen
List of rivers of Lower Saxony

Sources 
 Anke Breitlauch (editor): Die Lune – ein Fluß wird verlegt. Published by Wasser- und Bodenverband Untere Lune, Lunestedt 1987.

References

Rivers of Lower Saxony
Rivers of Bremen (state)
Rivers of Germany